The Dixie Association was an interleague partnership between the Texas League (TL) and the Southern League (SL) Double-A leagues of Minor League Baseball in 1971. The two leagues played an interlocking schedule. The partnership was dissolved after the season.

Each league consisted of seven teams who were divided among the association's three divisions. The West Division was composed of four TL teams. The Central Division had three TL teams and one SL team. The East Division consisted of six SL teams. At the end of the season, the two top teams from the SL competed for the Southern League championship—the Charlotte Hornets defeated the Asheville Tourists, 2–1. The TL winners of the Central and West Divisions met for the Texas League championship—the Arkansas Travelers defeated the Amarillo Giants, 2–0. The individual league champions then competed for the Dixie Association championship—Charlotte defeated Arkansas, 3–0.

Standings

References

External links
Dixie Association 1971 season at Baseball-reference.com

 
Defunct minor baseball leagues in the United States
Baseball leagues in Alabama
Baseball leagues in Arkansas
Baseball leagues in Florida
Baseball leagues in Georgia (U.S. state)
Baseball leagues in Louisiana
Baseball leagues in New Mexico
Baseball leagues in North Carolina
Baseball leagues in Tennessee
Baseball leagues in Texas
1971 establishments in the United States
1971 disestablishments in the United States
Sports leagues established in 1971
Sports leagues disestablished in 1971